Marion Francis Dolph (July 7, 1880 – November 11, 1921) was an American football player and coach. Dolph was a college football star at Williams College and the son of United States Senator Joseph N. Dolph. He served as the head football coach at the University of Oregon in 1902, compiling a record of 3–1–3.

Head coaching record

References

External links
 

19th-century births
1921 deaths
19th-century players of American football
Oregon Ducks football coaches
Williams Ephs football players
Sportspeople from Portland, Oregon
Players of American football from Portland, Oregon